Marie May Bignold (14 September 1927 – 11 October 2018) was an Australian politician. Born in Kiama, the daughter of solicitor Owen James Thomas and Sylvia May Reid, she studied law at the University of Sydney before being admitted as a solicitor in 1950. She married Justice Neal Bignold, a Judge of the Land and Environment Court of New South Wales, with whom she has one daughter, Alicia.

In 1984, she was appointed to the New South Wales Legislative Council for the Call to Australia Group, which was led by Fred Nile. Her appointment was the result of the resignation, due to ill health, of fellow party member Jim Cameron. She was the first female lawyer to take her seat in the Legislative Council. A committed Christian, she campaigned strongly against abortion. She was expelled from Call to Australia in November 1988 after a disagreement with the Niles over industrial relations policy. She thereafter held her seat as an Independent Member until the 1991 General Election, when she was one of three sitting Members whose seats were abolished by a Government sponsored Constitutional Amendment Bill which received majority approval at a Referendum held in conjunction with the 1991 General Election. Her legal challenge to the validity of that Bill was unsuccessful in the Courts. Thereafter she did not seek re-election to the Legislative Council.

References

1927 births
2018 deaths
Australian solicitors
Australian women lawyers
Members of the New South Wales Legislative Council
Christian Democratic Party (Australia) politicians
Independent members of the Parliament of New South Wales
Women members of the New South Wales Legislative Council
People from the Illawarra